"Adesso tu" is a 1986 Italian song composed by Eros Ramazzotti, Piero Cassano and Adelio Cogliati and performed by Eros Ramazzotti.  The song won the 36th edition of the Sanremo Music Festival. 
 
The semi-autobiographical lyrics were eventually reprised in "Rivincita", a 2010 single by Marracash featuring Giusy Ferreri.

Track listing and formats 

 Italian 7-inch single

A. "Adesso tu" – 4:00
B. "Un nuovo amore" – 4:00

Charts

Weekly charts

Certifications and sales

See also 

 List of number-one hits of 1986 (Italy)
 List of number-one singles of the 1980s (Switzerland)

References

External links 
 

1986 songs
1986 singles
Eros Ramazzotti songs
Number-one singles in Austria
Number-one singles in Italy
Number-one singles in Switzerland
Sanremo Music Festival songs
Songs written by Eros Ramazzotti